was a town located in Minamiuonuma District, Niigata Prefecture, Japan.

As of 2003, the town had an estimated population of 20,142 and a density of 105.94 persons per km2. The total area was 190.12 km2.

On October 1, 2005, Shiozawa was merged into the expanded city of Minamiuonuma.

Dissolved municipalities of Niigata Prefecture
Minamiuonuma